The men's 200 metre freestyle event at the 1984 Summer Olympics was held in the McDonald's Olympic Swim Stadium in Los Angeles, California, on July 29, 1984. There were 56 competitors from 36 nations, with each nation having up to two swimmers (down from a maximum of three in previous Games). The event was won by Michael Gross of West Germany, the nation's first victory in the event. His countryman Thomas Fahrner took bronze. Americans placed second and fourth, with Mike Heath earning silver and Jeff Float in fourth place.

Background

This was the seventh appearance of the 200 metre freestyle event. It was first contested in 1900. It would be contested a second time, though at 220 yards, in 1904. After that, the event did not return until 1968; since then, it has been on the programme at every Summer Games.

Two of the 8 finalists from the 1980 Games returned: sixth-place finisher Paolo Revelli of Italy and seventh-place finisher Thomas Lejdström of Sweden. The reigning World Champion was Michael Gross of West Germany, having beaten American Rowdy Gaines. Gross, who had also set a world record in the event earlier in 1984, was heavily favoured in Los Angeles. The host United States was represented by Mike Heath and Jeff Float, both strong medal contenders.

The People's Republic of China, Chinese Taipei, Denmark, Fiji, Honduras, the Netherlands Antilles, San Marino, Swaziland, Turkey, and Uruguay each made their debut in the event. Australia made its seventh appearance, the only nation to have competed in all prior editions of the event.

Competition format

The competition used a two-round (heats, final) format. The advancement rule followed the format introduced in 1952. A swimmer's place in the heat was not used to determine advancement; instead, the fastest times from across all heats in a round were used. There were 7 heats of up to 8 swimmers each. The top 8 swimmers advanced to the final. The 1984 event also introduced a consolation or "B" final; the swimmers placing 9th through 16th in the heats competed in this "B" final for placing. Swim-offs were used as necessary to break ties.

This swimming event used freestyle swimming, which means that the method of the stroke is not regulated (unlike backstroke, breaststroke, and butterfly events). Nearly all swimmers use the front crawl or a variant of that stroke. Because an Olympic-size swimming pool is 50 metres long, this race consisted of four lengths of the pool.

Records

Prior to this competition, the existing world and Olympic records were as follows.

The following records were established during the competition:

Schedule

All times are Pacific Daylight Time (UTC-7)

Results

Heats

Rule: The eight fastest swimmers advance to final A, while the next eight to final B.

Finals

Final B

Final A

References

External links
 Official Report
 USA Swimming

F
200 metre freestyle at the Olympics
Men's events at the 1984 Summer Olympics